Knollwood is an historic estate at 425 Salisbury Street in Worcester, Massachusetts. The estate was listed on the National Register of Historic Places in 1980. It is one of the city's grandest surviving early 20th-century estates.

Knollwood was built in the 1910s for industrialist Lyman Gordon (1861-1914), cofounder of Wyman-Gordon, although he died before it was completed.  The main house is a -story stucco construction, topped by a complex hipped tile roof.  Its basic form is that of a central block with slightly asymmetrical flanking wings.  The central portion has a slightly recessed pavilion that rises a full three stories to a decorated gable.  The eastern flanking wing housed kitchen facilities, while the west wing end features a Palladian window on the first floor which leads out to a terrace.  The approach to the house is along an imposing tree-lined allée.   The estate includes several outbuildings, also built c. 1914, which are styled similarly to the main house.  Among them area caretaker's house, carriage house or garage, and servants' quarters.

Following Gordon's death, the estate was purchased in 1917 by Lucius J. Knowles, president of Crompton and Knowles, and in 1928 by Theodore Ellis, another local company owner and art collector.  After Ellis' death much of the original estate was subdivided.  The remnant portion of the estate has been home to the private all-girl Notre Dame Academy since the 1950s.

See also
National Register of Historic Places listings in northwestern Worcester, Massachusetts
National Register of Historic Places listings in Worcester County, Massachusetts

References

Historic districts in Worcester, Massachusetts
Houses completed in 1914
National Register of Historic Places in Worcester, Massachusetts
Historic districts on the National Register of Historic Places in Massachusetts